Marúbo is a Panoan language of Brazil.

References

External links 

 Collections in the Archive of the Indigenous Languages of Latin America

Panoan languages
Languages of Brazil